Brian Michael Rowe (born November 16, 1988) is a former American soccer goalkeeper.

Youth soccer
Rowe went to South Eugene High School, where he was voted best defensive player in 2005 and MVP in 2006. He also was first team all-district in 2005 and 2006.

Rowe played college soccer at UCLA from 2007 to 2011. During the 2010 and 2011 seasons, he started all 44 games that the club played and kept 20 clean sheets in that time. He finished his UCLA career with a 37–8–5 record. In 2011, he was named a NSCAA Second-team All-American.

Professional career
Chivas USA selected Rowe in the second round (No. 24 overall) of the 2012 MLS Supplemental Draft. Rowe didn't earn a contract with Chivas USA, but did sign as a MLS League Pool goalkeeper.  On March 24, 2012, Rowe was signed to Toronto FC on an emergency basis. He was with the club until the signing of Quillan Roberts on April 10, 2012. In May, he joined the LA Galaxy on an emergency basis.  He also appeared in two reserve league matches for the Portland Timbers, and one with the Philadelphia Union.

LA Galaxy
On July 13, 2012, Rowe signed for Major League Soccer giants LA Galaxy. After signing for the Galaxy, he served as back-up goalkeeper for the 2–0 defeat against Seattle Sounders on May 2, and subsequently in a consecutive 1–0 defeat at home to New York three days later.

On April 27, 2013, he made his debut against Real Salt Lake with first-choice keeper, Carlo Cudicini out with a leg strain and backup keeper Brian Perk just returning from a sports-hernia surgery. His performance earned him a clean-sheet and helped the Galaxy to a 2–0 victory.

Vancouver Whitecaps
On December 15, 2017, Rowe was traded by LA to Vancouver Whitecaps FC in exchange for a second-round pick in the 2018 MLS SuperDraft. Rowe was released by Vancouver at the end of their 2018 season.

Orlando City
After initially training with the team on trial during preseason, Rowe signed a contract with Orlando City on February 22, 2019. He made his debut in the season opener, a 2–2 draw at home to New York City FC. He kept his first clean sheet for the team on March 23 in a 1–0 away win at New York Red Bulls.

Having lost the starting job to offseason recruit Pedro Gallese, Rowe made his first appearance in over a year on October 7, 2020 when Gallese was away an international duty. Rowe kept a clean sheet in a goalless draw away to Atlanta United. On November 21, Orlando played their first MLS playoff game in history against New York City FC. Rowe served as the backup keeper, however the game went to a penalty shootout. After starting keeper Gallese received a yellow card for leaving his goal line early, which resulted in his ejection from the game, as it was his second yellow of the match, Orlando attempted to substitute Rowe into the match. The referees initially allowed the substitution, however, after some deliberation, they ultimately ruled that Orlando was not eligible to make a substitution during a shootout, resulting in defender Rodrigo Schlegel donning the gloves. Orlando went on to win the match after Schlegel saved a penalty in the seventh round of the shootout. Rowe's contract expired at the end of the 2020 season. On May 25, 2021, Rowe announced his retirement from professional soccer.

International career
In January 2017, Rowe was called up to the United States national team.

Career statistics

Honors
LA Galaxy
 MLS Cup: 2014

References

External links
 
 UCLA bio

1988 births
Living people
American soccer players
UCLA Bruins men's soccer players
Ventura County Fusion players
LA Galaxy players
LA Galaxy II players
Vancouver Whitecaps FC players
Orlando City SC players
Association football goalkeepers
Sportspeople from Eugene, Oregon
Soccer players from Chicago
Chivas USA draft picks
USL League Two players
Major League Soccer players
USL Championship players
Soccer players from Oregon